Alexander Vladimirovich Volkov (born August 2, 1997) is a Russian professional ice hockey winger for SKA Saint Petersburg of the Kontinental Hockey League (KHL). He was selected by the Tampa Bay Lightning in the second round (48th overall) of the 2017 NHL Entry Draft. Volkov won the Stanley Cup as a member of the Lightning in 2020.

Playing career

Juniors
Volkov developed as junior age player in the SKA Saint Petersburg farm system. In his second season Volkov helped SKA-1946 of the MHL to capture the Kharlamov Cup as league champion. Volkov split his final season of draft eligibility between playing for the SKA-1946 Saint Petersburg and SKA-Neva of the VHL. Volkov skated in 128 games within the SKA system, recording 33 goals and 61 points. At the end of the season Volkov's contract ended with SKA St. Petersburg. Volkov was drafted 48th overall in the 2017 NHL Entry Draft by the Tampa Bay Lightning. On June 29, 2017, Volkov signed a three-year entry-level contract with the Lightning.

Professional
On October 29, 2019, Volkov was informed by Lightning general manager Julien BriseBois that he would be making his NHL debut the following night. The Lightning formally announced Volkov's recall from the Syracuse Crunch on October 30. Volkov made his NHL debut that night in a 7–6 win over the New Jersey Devils at the Prudential Center. On January 14, 2020, Volkov recorded his first career NHL assist and point in a 4–3 shootout against the Los Angeles Kings at Amalie Arena.

Volkov was one of the eight players called up to the Lightning for their training camp prior to the 2020 Stanley Cup playoffs. Volkov made his Stanley Cup playoff debut in Game 6 of the 2020 Stanley Cup Finals, drawing a tripping penalty which led to the Stanley Cup-winning power play goal, as the Lightning would win Game 6 and defeat the Dallas Stars in 6 games, winning the Stanley Cup.

In the following pandemic-delayed 2020–21 season, Volkov remained on the Lightning's opening night roster and on February 13, 2021, Volkov scored his first career NHL goal which came against the Florida Panthers. After posting three goals and five points through 19 games with the Lightning, on March 24, Volkov was traded to the Anaheim Ducks in exchange for forward Antoine Morand and a conditional seventh-round pick in the 2023 NHL Entry Draft.

On October 26, 2021, Volkov was placed on unconditional waivers by the Ducks, and he then signed a four-year contract with SKA Saint Petersburg of the Kontinental Hockey League (KHL) on October 27.

Career statistics

Regular season and playoffs

International

Awards and honors

References

External links
 

1997 births
Living people
Anaheim Ducks players
Ice hockey people from Moscow
Russian ice hockey forwards
San Diego Gulls (AHL) players
SKA Saint Petersburg players
SKA-Neva players
Stanley Cup champions
Syracuse Crunch players
Tampa Bay Lightning draft picks
Tampa Bay Lightning players